Abraham Howell (died 1727) was a British colonial governor. He was Deputy Governor of Anguilla from 1666 to 1689.

References

Deputy Governors of Anguilla
Year of birth unknown
1727 deaths